Jakob Heilmann (21 August 1846 in Geiselbach, Aschaffenburg County (Lower Franconia) – 15 February 1927 in Munich) was a German contractor.

Son of a glazier, Heilmann attended the construction school in Munich and graduated with the exam as a master builder.
 
Since 1866, he was into railway construction and in 1871 established the builders J. Heilmann in Regensburg. In 1892, his son-in-law, the young architect Professor Max Littmann (1862-1931) joined him, so the construction company of Heilmann & Littmann KG (after 1897 GmbH) came into existence. The real estate business was taken care by the Heilmann'sche Immobilien-Gesellschaft AG and several other related companies.

Heilmann engaged mostly in the building of family homes and mansions, among others in Munich Gern and in Solln-Prinz-Ludwigshöhe.

Magnificent and monumental buildings included the Schackgalerie, the Prinzregententheater, Münchener Neueste Nachrichten, Hofbräuhaus-rebuilding in Munich and several health resort hotels in other parts of Bavaria.

After the partners Littmann and Richard Reverdy left in 1908 und 1909, his sons Albert and Otto joined the construction company..

Furthermore, Jakob Heilmann initiated the founding of the electric power provider Isarwerke GmbH.

Literature 
 Ausgeführte Bauten von Heilmann und Littmann, München. München: Bruckmann o. J.
 Familienhäuser-Colonie Nymphenburg-Gern. Ein praktischer Versuch zur Lösung der volkswirthschaftlichen Frage des Familienhauses. München: L. Werner.
 Das königliche Hofbräuhaus in München, entworfen und ausgeführt von Heilmann & Littmann. München: Werner 1897.
 Der Saalbau der Brauerei zum Münchner Kindl, von Heilmann und Littmann. [München]: Mühlthaler 1899.
 Saalbau der Brauerei zum Bayerischen Löwen in München, entworfen und ausgeführt vom Baugeschäft Heilmann und Littmann in München. [München]: Mühlthaler 1900.
 Das Prinzregenten-Theater in München Erbaut vom Baugeschäft Heilmann & Littmann. Denkschrift zur Feier d. Eröffnung. München : Werner, 1901.
 Das Königliche Theater in Bad Kissingen erbaut von Heilmann & Littmann, München. München: Heilmann'sche Immobilien-Gesellschaft 1905.
 Zwei Münchener Warenhausbauten: Auszug aus der Denkschrift gelegentlich der Fertigstellung des Kaufhauses Oberpollinger und des Warenhauses Hermann Tietz in München. O.O. ca. 1905
 Wolf, Georg Jacob: Ingenieur J. Heilmann und das Baugeschäft Heilmann und Littmann. Ein Rückblick auf vierzig Jahre Arbeit. München 1911. 
 Wald-Villen-Colonie Prinz Ludwigshöhe. München 1924/25.
 Ansprachen anläßlich des Festaktes zum hundertjährigen Bestehen der Heilmann und Littmann Bau-AG am 27. Oktober 1971 im Festsaal der Bayerischen Akademie der Wissenschaften in München. München: Heilmann-und-Littmann-Bau-Aktiengesellschaft 1971.
 Planen und Bauen für die Zukunft 100 Jahre Heilmann & Littmann Bau-Aktiengesellschaft, München. Heilbronn: Schilling 1971. 
 Herder, Dorothea v.: 100 Jahre Villenkolonie Gern. München: Verein zur Erhaltung Gerns 1992.
 Rauck, Michael et al.: Jakob Heilmann 150 Jahre: 1846 - 1927; Einweihung "Röhrborn" 25. August 1996. [Hrsg.: Gemeinde Geiselbach]. Geiselbach: Gemeinde Geiselbach 1996.
 Gribl, Dorle:  Villenkolonien in München und Umgebung der Einfluß Jakob Heilmanns auf die Stadtentwicklung. München: Buchendorfer Verlag 1999.
 Gribl, Dorle: Geiselgasteig im Isartal: "erlesenstes Ziel stadtflüchtiger Wünsche". München: Buchendorfer Verlag 2000.

Schriften 
 Anregung zur Gründung eines Bauvereins in Aschaffenburg. In: Intelligenzblatt. Beiblatt zur Aschaffenburger Zeitung 28.-31. März 1868, Nr. 124-127.
 München in seiner baulichen Entwicklung: ein Blick in deren Vergangenheit, Gegenwart und Zukunft. München: Kellerer 1881.
 Vorschläge als nothwendige Grundlage für die bessere Gestaltung und Entwicklung des Straßennetzes und der hauptsächlichen Verkehrsadern der Stadt München. Druckschrift.
 Lebenserinnerungen. München: Knorr & Hirth, 1921.

External links 
 Jakob Heilmann and his family

1846 births
1927 deaths
Businesspeople from Bavaria
Architects from Munich
People from the Kingdom of Bavaria
People from Aschaffenburg (district)